Borgia Egan (22 March 1876 - 11 February 1962) was a member of the Sisters of Mercy. She founded Mercyhurst College in 1926 and served as its first president. As an advocate of women's higher education, she believed that women should have the same chances and opportunities that men do. This was the foundation of her journey, along with her Catholic faith.

Life 
Borgia Egan was born on 22 March 1876. She graduated from Catholic University and Duquesne University. She joined the Sisters of Mercy in 1831, and brought the lessons from the sisters to Erie, Pennsylvania, in the year 1920. Egan became Mother Superior of the Sisters of Mercy in Erie, Pennsylvania and became a well-known and well-liked member of the Diocese of Erie. She was a very enthusiastic speaker for women's higher education and with the assistance and support of Bishop Gannon, she sought to establish an institution of higher education for women in Erie.
She founded Mercyhurst College in 1926 and became the first president of the institution, serving from 1926 to 1962. She was known as the "6 foot nun" because she towered over all other students and faculty. She was described by her students as having "a towering stance and ready sense of humor combined with this intellectual prowess to make her an unforgettable woman." During her served time as President of Mercyhurst College, she suffered a stroke in 1956 and was hospitalized for three years after. Borgia Egan remained the president of Mercyhurst College until her death at age 84 on 11 February 1962.

Sisters of Mercy 
The Sisters of Mercy, also known as the Religious Sisters of Mercy (RSM), were founded in 1831 by Catherine McAuley in Dublin, Ireland. She encouraged peace and harmony in all people. Born in Dublin Ireland, McAuley wanted to change the religious views of Dublin and to promote peace and safety for women and children. To carry out her mission, she created a house for religious worship, run and organized by other women like her. Titled, "The House of Mercy," this was a place for poor women and children to feel safe and was the foundation of the Sisters of Mercy. The three main values and purposes that McAuley wanted to enforce in the religious safe place were healthcare, education, and social welfare. The main goal of the Sisters of Mercy is to serve anyone who is suffering from illness, poverty, or struggling with day to day life. They have founded schools in countries like Ireland, United States, and Canada. There were over 11,000 members of the Sisters of Mercy across the globe in 2001.

Core Values of the Sisters of Mercy 
 Spirituality
 Community
 Service
 Social Justice and Our Critical Concerns
 Works of Mercy

Mission Statement 
"We carry out the mission of mercy guided by prayerful consideration of the needs of our time."

Mercyhurst University 
Borgia Egan brought the Sisters of Mercy to Erie, Pennsylvania, in the United States to help spread the values of the Sisters throughout the world. After they arrived in Erie, Bishop Gannon of the Diocese of Erie approached Egan about creating an institution that focused on the women in the community. With the help of the Sisters of Mercy, Egan took out all of the money from the bank and bought a large piece of land to fulfill Gannon's wishes. On 8 September 1924, construction started for the new college. The building itself was designed by architect F. Ferdinand Durang in a Tudor Gothic style. Egan wanted the exterior to have as much detail as the interior of the building. However, near the end of the project, the workers went on strike and the Sisters of Mercy in Erie had to complete the project on their own.

Mercyhurst College was founded on 7 September 1926 in Erie, Pennsylvania. Originally an all Catholic, women’s institution, Mercyhurst College opened with the help of the Sisters of Mercy in the Diocese of Erie. With Egan as the first president, the college sought to enhance the learning experiences of young women and to give them a chance to use their potential. There was only 23 students that attended the college when it first opened, but the number of students grew soon enough. Egan remained president of Mercyhurst College from 1926 to 1963, all while maintaining the position of Mother Superior for the Sisters of Mercy in the Diocese of Erie.

Mercyhurst College became a co-ed institution in 1969. On 25 January 2012, Mercyhurst College was officially renamed Mercyhurst University. There is now a Mother Borgia Egan scholarship, titled, ‘Mother M. Borgia Egan Endowed Scholarship,’ that is given out each year to a student who is seeking out in pursuing a career of teaching and is following in the footsteps of Egan.

Core values of Mercyhurst 
The core values of Mercyhurst University reflect those of the Sisters of Mercy.
 Socially Merciful
 Globally Responsible
 Compassionately Hospitable
 Intellectually Creative
 Reflectively Aware
 Ambassadors of Service

References 
 
 
1876 births
1962 deaths
Education in Erie, Pennsylvania
Sisters of Mercy
Mercyhurst University
20th-century American Roman Catholic nuns